Martin Winter may refer to:
 Martin Winter (mayor) (born 1962), mayor of Doncaster, England
 Martin Winter (rower) (1955–1988), German rower
 Martin Winter (chemist) (born 1965), German chemist and materials scientist